Killer Nunatak is a granite nunatak,  high, near the center of the Emlen Peaks,  northwest of Mount Phelan, in the Usarp Mountains of Antarctica. It was named by the northern party of the New Zealand Geological Survey Antarctic Expedition, 1963–64, for its distinctive outline resembling the dorsal fin of a killer whale.

References

Nunataks of Victoria Land
Pennell Coast